Rémi Biancardini (born 12 August 1992) is a French professional footballer who currently plays as a striker for Olympique Club Eybens.

He started his career in the youth team at Grenoble Foot 38, and made two appearances in the club's reserve team before joining Tours in 2010. Since making his professional debut on 27 May 2011, coming on as a substitute for Song Jin-Hyung in the 0–1 defeat at Sedan, he has played more than 30 first-team matches for the club.

References

External links

Rémi Biancardini career statistics at foot-national.com

1992 births
Living people
People from Saint-Martin-d'Hères
French footballers
Association football forwards
Grenoble Foot 38 players
Tours FC players
USJA Carquefou players
Hapoel Rishon LeZion F.C. players
F.C. Ashdod players
Maccabi Herzliya F.C. players
Ligue 2 players
Liga Leumit players
Expatriate footballers in Israel
French expatriate sportspeople in Israel
Sportspeople from Isère
Footballers from Auvergne-Rhône-Alpes